Elvira Barbashina (born February 25, 1963) is a retired Uzbekistani runner who specialized in the 100 and 200 metres. During her active years she represented Soviet Union. She holds the current Uzbekistani record in 200 meters.

Personal bests
100 metres - 11.12 s (July 1986)
200 metres - 22.27 s (July 1986)

References
 

1963 births
Living people
Soviet female sprinters
Uzbekistani female sprinters
Goodwill Games medalists in athletics
Competitors at the 1986 Goodwill Games
Place of birth missing (living people)